Daphnella gascognensis is an extinct species of sea snail, a marine gastropod mollusc in the family Raphitomidae.

Description

Distribution
Fossils of this marine species were found in Oligocene strata in Southwest France.

References

 Lozouet P. (2017). Les Conoidea de l'Oligocène supérieur (Chattien) du bassin de l'Adour (Sud-Ouest de la France). Cossmanniana. 19: 3-180 page(s): 56, pl. 25 figs 15–17; pl. 26 fig. 12

gascognensis
Gastropods described in 2017